Michael Vyner (1943 - 20 October 1989) was an English arts administrator.

Formerly employed by the music publishers Schott Music, he was Musical Director of the London Sinfonietta from 1972 until his death in 1989. He was one of the victims of the Aids epidemic.

Vyner's death occasioned a range of musical tributes from some of the major composers of the day, including Hans Werner Henze (Requiem), Luciano Berio (Leaf, for piano), Harrison Birtwistle (Ritual Fragment), Toru Takemitsu (Litany - In Memory of Michael Vyner and My Way of Life - In Memory of Michael Vyner ), Peter Maxwell Davies (Threnody on a Plainsong for Michael Vyner) Henryk Górecki (Good Night, In Memoriam Michael Vyner) and Oliver Knussen (Secret Psalm).

From 1990 to 2004 there was a Michael Vyner Trust, established to assist young composers and commission new works. Michael Vyner's papers are held by the British Library.

References

1943 births
1989 deaths
British arts administrators